Carmelo Marrero (born January 26, 1981) is an American former professional mixed martial artist who competed in the Heavyweight and Light Heavyweight divisions. He has competed for the UFC, WEC, Bellator Fighting Championships, the IFL, and the XFC.

Background
Marrero was born in Philadelphia, Pennsylvania and raised in Douglassville, Pennsylvania. He was diagnosed with cancer at a young age and eventually was able to overcome the illness. Marrero began wrestling for Daniel Boone High School in Berks County, Pennsylvania and placed sixth in the state tournament as a Heavyweight. Marrero had originally wanted to attend Rider University after graduating from high school, decided to attend Gloucester County College for two and a half years where he set multiple records. Marrero was sidelined by a near-fatal car accident which took him six months to recover, but later came back to win over 40 matches and qualify for the Junior College National Tournament. Marrero later transferred to Rider University where he became the team captain and was a two-time national qualifier. After college, Marrero began venturing into mixed martial arts.

Mixed martial arts career

Early career
Marrero's first five professional bouts were against local opponents in small fight promotions along the New Jersey shore. Marrero would go on to win and dominate all five bouts before being signed by the UFC.

Ultimate Fighting Championship
Marrero made his UFC debut against a much larger and more experienced opponent in Cheick Kongo who already had two wins for the organization. Marrero used his superior grappling skills to control the bout and won via a split decision.

In his next fight he faced Gabriel Gonzaga, with the winner to get a shot to fight Mirko "Cro Cop" Filipović for the #1 contender spot; Marrero lost this fight in the first round via submission due to an armbar submission. He dropped down to the Light Heavyweight division to face Wilson Gouveia at UFC 71, but was again defeated via first-round submission and was then released from the UFC.

International Fight League
Marrero competed for American Top Team's camp in the International Fight League and made his debut for the organization on April 4, 2008 at IFL: New Jersey where he faced Mike Ciesnolevicz. The fight was ruled a no-contest after an accidental headbutt in the first round.

World Extreme Cagefighting
Marrero made his WEC debut on November 5, 2008 at WEC 36 against Steve Steinbess and won via split decision.

Return to the UFC
Following his win against Steinbess, Marrero returned to the UFC on April 1, 2009 facing Ryan Bader at UFC Fight Night 18. He lost the fight via unanimous decision, and was released from the promotion once again.

Bellator
Carmelo was set to make his promotional debut with Bellator at Bellator 69 against Seth Petruzelli, however the bout was canceled the day of the event due to Petruzelli not being medically cleared to fight.

Marrero made his Bellator debut on October 19, 2012 at Bellator 77 against Lew Polley and lost via unanimous decision.

Championships and accomplishments
Cage Fury Fighting Championships
CFFC Heavyweight Championship (One time)

Mixed martial arts record

|-
| Win
| align=center| 16–6 (1)
| Shelton Graves 
| Submission (leglock)
| XFE 28: Atiyeh vs. Gratalo 2 
| 
| align=center| 1
| align=center| 1:33
| Bethlehem, Pennsylvania, United States
| 
|-
| Win
| align=center| 15–6 (1)
| J.A. Dudley
| TKO (punches)
| XFE: Cage Wars 24
| 
| align=center| 2
| align=center| 1:54
| Bethlehem, Pennsylvania, United States
| 
|-
| Loss
| align=center| 14–6 (1)
| Lew Polley
| Decision (unanimous)
| Bellator 77
| 
| align=center| 3
| align=center| 5:00
| Reading, Pennsylvania, United States
| 
|-
| Win
| align=center| 14–5 (1)
| Scott Barrett
| Decision (unanimous)
| XFC 14: Resurrection
| 
| align=center| 3
| align=center| 5:00
| Orlando, Florida, United States
| 
|-
| Loss
| align=center| 13–5 (1)
| Mark Holata
| Decision (unanimous) 
| C3 Fights: SlamFest
| 
| align=center| 3
| align=center| 5:00
| Newkirk, Oklahoma, United States
| 
|-
| Win
| align=center| 13–4 (1)
| Steven Banks
| Submission (guillotine choke) 
| WCC 3: Brawl at the Hall
| 
| align=center| 2
| align=center| 2:33
| Allentown, Pennsylvania, United States
| 
|-
| Win
| align=center| 12–4 (1)
| Brian Heden
| Decision (unanimous)
| C3 Fights: Knockout-Rockout Weekend 4
| 
| align=center| 3
| align=center| 3:00
| Clinton, Oklahoma, United States
| 
|-
| Win
| align=center| 11–4 (1)
| Wayne Cole
| Submission (guillotine choke)
| C3 Fights: Slammin Jammin Weekend 4
| 
| align=center| 2
| align=center| 2:37
| Nashville, Tennessee, United States
| 
|-
| Loss
| align=center| 10–4 (1)
| Antwain Britt
| Decision (unanimous)
| Vendetta Fighting Championship: A Night of Vengeance
| 
| align=center| 3
| align=center| 5:00
| Oranjestad, Aruba
| 
|-
| Loss
| align=center| 10–3 (1)
| Ryan Bader
| Decision (unanimous)
| UFC Fight Night: Condit vs. Kampmann
| 
| align=center| 3
| align=center| 5:00
| Nashville, Tennessee, United States
| 
|-
| Win
| align=center| 10–2 (1)
| Steve Steinbeiss
| Decision (split)
| WEC 36
| 
| align=center| 3
| align=center| 5:00
| Hollywood, Florida, United States
| 
|-
| Win
| align=center| 9–2 (1)
| Chuck Huus
| Submission (ankle lock)
| C3 Fights: Clash in Concho
| 
| align=center| N/A
| align=center| N/A
| Concho, Oklahoma, United States
| 
|-
| Win
| align=center| 8–2 (1)
| Rader McHugh
| Submission (rear-naked choke)
| C3 Fights: Showdown 2
| 
| align=center| 2
| align=center| 2:48
| Cherokee, North Carolina, United States
| 
|-
| NC
| align=center| 7–2 (1)
| Mike Ciesnolevicz
| No Contest (accidental headbutt)
| IFL: New Jersey
| 
| align=center| 1
| align=center| 1:37
| East Rutherford, New Jersey, United States
|
|-
| Win
| align=center| 7–2
| Rafael del Real
| TKO (doctor stoppage)
| WCO: Kerr vs. Gavin
| 
| align=center| 1
| align=center| 5:00
| Hollywood, California, United States
| 
|-
| Loss
| align=center| 6–2
| Wilson Gouveia
| Submission (guillotine choke)
| UFC 71
| 
| align=center| 1
| align=center| 3:06
| Las Vegas, Nevada, United States
| 
|-
| Loss
| align=center| 6–1
| Gabriel Gonzaga
| Submission (armbar)
| UFC 66
| 
| align=center| 1
| align=center| 3:22
| Las Vegas, Nevada, United States
| 
|-
| Win
| align=center| 6–0
| Cheick Kongo
| Decision (split)
| UFC 64
| 
| align=center| 3
| align=center| 5:00
| Las Vegas, Nevada, United States
| 
|-
| Win
| align=center| 5–0
| Petrus Walker
| TKO (doctor stoppage)
| Cage Fury Fighting Championships 1
| 
| align=center| 1
| align=center| 2:43
| Atlantic City, New Jersey, United States
| 
|-
| Win
| align=center| 4–0
| Dale Carson
| Submission (rear-naked choke)
| MFC: Boardwalk Blitz
| 
| align=center| 2
| align=center| 0:48
| Atlantic City, New Jersey, United States
| 
|-
| Win
| align=center| 3–0
| Sherman Pendergarst
| Decision (unanimous)
| RF 9: Battle at the Beach 2009
| 
| align=center| 2
| align=center| 5:00
| Wildwood, New Jersey, United States
| 
|-
| Win
| align=center| 2–0
| Chris Volo
| Decision (unanimous)
| Reality Fighting 8
| 
| align=center| 2
| align=center| 5:00
| Atlantic City, New Jersey, United States
| 
|-
| Win
| align=center| 1–0
| Chris Dippolito
| Submission (rear-naked choke)
| Reality Fighting 7
| 
| align=center| 1
| align=center| 1:02
| Atlantic City, New Jersey, United States
|

References

External links
 Carmelo's Official Website
 
 

American male mixed martial artists
Mixed martial artists from Pennsylvania
Light heavyweight mixed martial artists
Mixed martial artists utilizing collegiate wrestling
1981 births
Living people
Rider Broncs
People from Coconut Creek, Florida
Ultimate Fighting Championship male fighters
American male sport wrestlers
People from Berks County, Pennsylvania
Sportspeople from Philadelphia
College wrestlers in the United States